The 27th Rhythmic Gymnastics European Championships was held in Minsk, Belarus from 25 to 29 May 2011.

Medal winners

Results

Seniors

Team

Hoop 
Final was held on Sunday, 29 May 2011 at 13:30 local time.

Ball 
Final was held on Sunday, 29 May 2011 at 14:02 local time.

Clubs 
Final was held on Sunday, 29 May 2011 at 14:34 local time.

Ribbon 
Final was held on Sunday, 29 May 2011 at 15:06 local time.

Juniors

Group All-around 
The final was held on Sunday 28 May 2011 at 10:00 local time.

Group: 5 ropes 
The final was held on Sunday 29 May 2011 at 11:00 local time.

Medal count

Seniors

Juniors

References

External links

UEG Site
 Rhythmic Gymnastics Results

European Rhythmic Gymnastics Championships
Rhythmic Gymnastics European Championships
European Rhythmic Gymnastics Championships
International gymnastics competitions hosted by Belarus